Ian Rankin (born 5 September 1979 in Bellshill, Scotland) is a  former professional and semi-professional footballer and former manager of Blantyre Victoria and Newmains United in the Scottish Junior Football Association Central District First Division and Second Division.

On 24 June 2010, Rankin left Newmains United to become the new manager of Blantyre Victoria after Willie Harvey resigned to take over at Rutherglen Glencairn.

On 28 October 2011, Rankin rejoined Newmains United as manager till October 2013.

References

External links

1979 births
Living people
Scottish footballers
Airdrieonians F.C. (1878) players
Scottish Football League players
Albion Rovers F.C. players
Association football forwards
Footballers from Bellshill